The post of Mufti in Algiers, or Shaykh al-Djazaïr, has been filled by a member of the Maliki and Hanafi ulema, the religious scholars, of Algiers, within the Algerian Islamic reference.

Maliki muftis
Several Maliki Muftis professed in Algiers:
 Abd al-Rahman al-Tha'alibi
 Ahmed Zouaoui
 Sidi M'hamed Bou Qobrine
 
 
 
 
 Ali Ben El-Haffaf
 
 Mohamed Saïd Benzekri
 Mahmoud Bendali
 Hamoud Hamdane
 
 
 Mohamed Charef

Hanafi muftis 
Several Hanafi Muftis professed in Algiers:
 
 Hamdan Khodja

See also

Islam in Algeria
Algerian islamic reference
Zawiyas in Algeria
List of Islamic muftiates
Muftiate
Mufti
Grand Mufti
Imam

References

Muftis of Algiers
Algiers
Lists of Islamic religious leaders
Muslim scholars of Islamic jurisprudence